Armona is an unincorporated community in Blount County, Tennessee, in the United States.

The origin of the name Armona is uncertain, but it may refer to a type of strawberry.

References

Unincorporated communities in Blount County, Tennessee
Unincorporated communities in Tennessee